The Ammendorf family was a family of Brandenburg nobility from which the Blumenthal and Grabow families originated, by a change of name.

History 
The earliest known member was Fritz von Ammendorf who took part in a tournament in 969 in Merseburg. The next documentary reference to the family is in 1224 when "Albertus de Ammendorf" is mentioned. The continuous family tree begins in 1239 with Heinemann von Ammendorf. An Albertus de Ammendorf appears in 1263–71 as Provincial Governor of the Bailliwick of Thuringia in the county of Zwätzen. There is a reference in a Latin document of 1266 to Heinricus de Ammendorf nobilis vir. The family appears in Merseburg and in and around Halle, and later also owned estates in the diocese of Magdeburg and near Rothenburg. The family died out with Conrad von Ammendorf in 1550.

Prominent members 
 Gerhard von Ammendorf, Vogt of Salzwedel in 1225, referred to as “frater episcopi”
 Rutger or Rudgar von Ammendorf, 1241–51, son of the above, Bishop of Brandenburg, † 1251
 Heinrich von Ammendorf, 1283 Bishop of Merseburg, † 1300
 Heinrich von Ammendorf, 1477 Amtmann of the Archbishop of Magdeburg
 Jakob von Ammendorf, 1484 Canon of Magdeburg and Halberstadt

Arms 
Azure, the upper body of a bearded man with a Hungarian cap and Stulp. Crest of the same.

Books 
 Rüdiger Bier: 1500 Jahre Geschichte und Geschichten der herrschaftlichen Sitze zu Kirchscheidungen und Burgscheidungen
 Otto Schröter: Der letzte Herr von Ammendorf: Historical novel, 1933

German noble families
Thuringian nobility
Saxon nobility